The following are the football (soccer) events of the year 1974 throughout the world.

Events
The FIFA World Cup is held from June 12 to July 7 in West Germany. West Germany wins its second title, defeating much favored Netherlands 2–1 in the final. Surprisingly, Poland take 3rd after defeating Brazil 1–0. 
European Cup: Bayern Munich beats Atlético Madrid 4–0 in the final. This was the first German EC win.
UEFA Cup: Feyenoord wins 2–1 (Away) and 2–0 (Home) in the final against Tottenham Hotspur, winning the cup for the first time.
UEFA Cup Winners Cup: 1. FC Magdeburg wins 2–0 over AC Milan, winning the cup for the first time. This also marks the only instance of an East German club winning a European title.
Copa Libertadores 1974: Won by Independiente after defeating São Paulo Futebol Clube on an aggregate score of 1–0.
February 17 – Zamalek disaster, that occurred in Cairo, before a friendly match between Zamalek SC & Dukla Prague.
May 1 – PSV Eindhoven claims the Dutch Cup by defeating title holders NAC Breda: 6–0.
September 18 – Dutch club FC Amsterdam makes its European debut by defeating Malta's Hibernians F.C. 5–0 in the first round of the UEFA Cup, with two goals from Nico Jansen.

Winners club national championship

Asia
 Qatar: Al-Sadd SC

Europe
: Magdeburg
: Leeds United
: AS Saint-Étienne
: Újpest FC
: Lazio
: Feyenoord
: Ruch Chorzów
: Barcelona
: Fenerbahçe
: Bayern Munich
: Hajduk Split

North America
: Cruz Azul
 / :
 Los Angeles Aztecs (NASL)

South America
 Argentina
Metropolitano – Newell's Old Boys
Nacional – San Lorenzo
 Brazil – Vasco da Gama

International tournaments
 African Cup of Nations in Egypt (March 1 – 14 1974)
 
 
 
1974 British Home Championship (May 11–18, 1974)

 FIFA World Cup in West Germany (June 13 – July 7, 1974)

Births

 January 2 – Jason de Vos, Canadian footballer and sportscaster
 January 6 – Daniel Cordone, Argentinian striker 
 January 10 – Bob Peeters, Belgian footballer
 January 11 – Jens Nowotny, German footballer
 January 20 – David Dei, Italian club footballer and coach
 January 22 – Jörg Böhme, German footballer
 January 31 – Bob Mulder, Dutch footballer
 March 5 – Jens Jeremies, German footballer
 March 9 – Franz Calustro, Bolivian footballer
 March 14 – Mark Fish, South-African footballer
 March 30 – Tomislav Butina, Croatian footballer
 April 6 – Robert Kovač, Croatian footballer
 May 28 – Hans-Jörg Butt, German footballer
 June 26 – Pablo Galdames, Chilean footballer
 August 29 – Denis Caniza, Paraguayan footballer
 September 5 – Ivo Ulich, Czech footballer
 September 7 – Macamito (Paulo "Macamito" Macamo), Mozambican footballer
 September 16 – Fricson George, Ecuadorian footballer
 October 5 – Jeff Strasser, Luxembourgish footballer
 November 4 – Jérôme Leroy, French footballer.
 November 9 – Alessandro Del Piero, Italian footballer
 November 10 – Igor Sypniewski, Polish footballer (died 2022)
 November 16 – Paul Scholes, English footballer
 December 3 – Damiën Hertog, Dutch footballer
 December 12 – Franklin Anangonó, Ecuadorian footballer
 December 20 – Paul Linger, English club footballer
 December 22
 Michael Barron, English club footballer, coach, and manager
 Dani García, Spanish international
 December 24 – Marcelo Salas, Chilean footballer

Deaths

March
 March 26 – Werner Kohlmeyer, West-German defender, winner of the 1954 FIFA World Cup. (49, heart failure)

June
 June 8 – Anfilogino Guarisi, Brazilian/Italian striker, winner of the 1934 FIFA World Cup and first ever Italian player to score in a FIFA World Cup qualification match. (68)
 June 13 – Ernesto Vidal, Uruguayan striker, winner of the 1950 FIFA World Cup. (52)

July
 July 1 – Kick Smit, Dutch footballer. (62)

September
 September 24 – Canhoteiro, Brazilian striker, winner of the Pequena Taça do Mundo of 1955. (41)

October
 October 28 – Everaldo, Brazilian left back, winner of the 1970 FIFA World Cup and active player of Grêmio Foot-Ball Porto Alegrense . (30 ; car crash)

References

 
Association football by year